Phrynopus is a genus of frogs of the family Strabomantidae. Their common name is Andes frogs. They are endemic to Peru and inhabit the upper humid montane forest and supra-treeline grassland in the Cordillera Oriental, with one record from the Peruvian Cordillera Occidental.

Taxonomy
The contents and phylogenetic position of Phrynopus have long been uncertain, and many species once included in this genus have now been moved to other genera (Bryophryne, Lynchius, Isodactylus (now Hypodactylus), Noblella, Niceforonia, and Psychrophrynella). Hedges and colleagues placed it in 2008 in the family Strabomantidae, subfamily Strabomantinae.

Description
Head is narrower than the body. Differentiated tympanic membrane and tympanic annulus are usually absent, except in Phrynopus auriculatus  and Phrynopus peruanus, two basal species. Dorsum is smooth to pustulate. Venter is smooth or
areolate.

Species
The following species are recognised in the genus Phrynopus:

References

 
Amphibians of South America
Endemic fauna of Peru
Amphibian genera
Taxa named by Wilhelm Peters